Paul Allan Zaeske (December 4, 1945 – April 18, 1992) was an American football wide receiver who played two seasons with the Houston Oilers of the American Football League and National Football League. He played college football at North Park University and attended Sterling High School in Sterling, Illinois. He was also a member of the Houston Texans of the World Football League.

College career
Zaeske played college football for the North Park Vikings. He set an NCAA Division II record for receiving touchdowns in a game with eight on October 12, 1968 against North Central College.

Professional career

Houston Oilers
Zaeske played in eleven games for the Houston Oilers from 1969 to 1970.

Houston Texans
Zaeske played for the Houston Texans of the World Football League in 1974.

References

External links
Just Sports Stats

1945 births
1992 deaths
Players of American football from Iowa
American football wide receivers
North Park Vikings football players
Houston Oilers players
Houston Texans (WFL) players
Sportspeople from Sioux City, Iowa
American Football League players